Queen Creek High School is a public secondary school located in Queen Creek, Arizona.

History

The Queen Creek school district did not open a high school until 1986, when it became a unified school district; previously, the school district bused high school students to other schools far from town. In 1988, the school graduated its first class of 22 seniors, attending classes in a 12-room school building. By the fall of 1988, Queen Creek High had 387 students. Two years later, its principal retired in an uproar over the alteration of the low grades of 50 students. The fast-growing school, housed in a former elementary school with additional portable classroom buildings, was approved in 1999 to move to a new site at Signal Butte and Ocotillo roads The new school opened in 2002 and allowed Queen Creek's middle school to absorb the former high school site.

In November 2012, their football team won the Division III state championship with an undefeated 14–0 season.

The Queen Creek Unified School District opened a second high school, Eastmark High School, in 2019, with the northern portion of the district being zoned into the new school.

References

External links
 

Schools in Maricopa County, Arizona
Educational institutions established in 1986
Public high schools in Arizona
1986 establishments in Arizona